Chin Iee-chong (13 December 1921 – 11 May 1995) was a South Korean politician who served as Prime Minister of South Korea and Member of Opposition in National assembly of South Korea in 1971 and again in 1973. He was the founder of Borinara Hagwon Farm, largest barley farm of South Korea.

Personal life 
He was born on 13 December 1921 in Gochang County and died on 11 May 1995.

Career 
On 14 October 1983, he replaced Kim Sang-hyup as Prime Minister of South Korea. He was head of Council of State which was appointed by Chun Doo-hwan. On 19 February 1985, he resigned as Prime Minister of South Korea. He was succeeded by Lho Shin-yong.

References 

Prime Ministers of South Korea
20th-century South Korean politicians

1921 births
1995 deaths
People from Gochang County